Meghai Jarani Gaon is a village located in the Sonitpur district of Assam, India. According to the 2011 census, its population is 923; 496 males and 427 females, and its literacy rate is 57%. It is 196.24 hectares in area, and contains about 181 houses.

References 

Villages in Sonitpur district